The Western Cape is a province of South Africa, situated on the south-western coast of the country. About two-thirds of these inhabitants live in the metropolitan area of Cape Town, which is also the provincial capital. The Western Cape was created in 1994 from part of the former Cape Province. The two largest cities are Cape Town and George.

Geography

The Western Cape Province is roughly L-shaped, extending north and east from the Cape of Good Hope, in the southwestern corner of South Africa. It stretches about  northwards along the Atlantic coast and about  eastwards along the South African south coast (Southern Indian Ocean). It is bordered on the north by the Northern Cape and on the east by the Eastern Cape. It is roughly the size of England or the State of Louisiana. Its capital city and largest city is Cape Town, and some other major cities include Stellenbosch, Worcester, Paarl, and George. The Garden Route and the Overberg are popular coastal tourism areas.

The Western Cape is the southernmost region of the African continent with Cape Agulhas as its southernmost point, only 3800 km from the Antarctic coastline. The coastline varies from sandy between capes, to rocky to steep and mountainous in places. The only natural harbour is Saldanha Bay on the west coast, about 140 km north of Cape Town. However a lack of fresh water in the region meant that it has only recently been used as a harbour. The province's main harbour was built in Table Bay, which in its natural state was fully exposed to the northwesterly storms that bring rain to the province in winter, as well as the almost uninterrupted dry southeasterly winds in summer. But fresh water coming off Table Mountain and Devil's Peak allowed the early European settlers to build Cape Town on the shores of this less than satisfactory anchorage.

Topography 
The province is topographically exceptionally diverse. Most of the province falls within the Cape Fold Belt, a set of nearly parallel ranges of sandstone folded mountains of Cambrian-Ordovician age (the age of the rocks is from 510 to about 330 million years ago; their folding into mountains occurred about 350 to about 270 million years ago). The height of the mountain peaks in the different ranges varies from 1000 m to 2300 m. The valleys between ranges are generally very fertile, as they contain the weathered loamy soils of the Bokkeveld mudstones (see the diagrams below).

The far interior forms part of the Karoo. This region of the province is generally arid and hilly, with a prominent escarpment that runs close to the Province's most inland boundary.

Escarpment
The escarpment marks the southwestern edge of South Africa's central plateau (see the middle and bottom diagrams on the left). It runs parallel to the entire South African coastline, except in the very far northeast, where it is interrupted by the Limpopo River valley, and in the far northwest, where it is interrupted by the Orange River valley. The 1000 km-long northeastern stretch of the escarpment is called the Drakensberg, which is geographically and geologically quite distinct from the Cape Fold Mountains, which originated much earlier and totally independently of the origin of the escarpment.

Rivers
The principal rivers of the province are the Berg and Olifants which drain into the Atlantic Ocean, and the Breede and Gourits which drain into the Indian Ocean.

Flora

The vegetation of the region is also extremely diverse, with one of the world's seven floral kingdoms almost exclusively endemic to the province, namely the Cape Floral Kingdom, most of which is covered by Fynbos (from the Afrikaans meaning "Fine Bush" (Dutch: Fijnbosch), though precisely how it came to be referred to as such, is uncertain.). These evergreen heathlands are extremely rich in species diversity, with at least as many plant species occurring on Table Mountain as in the entire United Kingdom. It is characterised by various types of shrubs, thousands of herbaceous flowering plant species and some grasses. With the exception of the Silver tree, Leucadendron argenteum, which only grows on the granite and clay soils of the Cape Peninsula, open fynbos is generally treeless except in the wetter mountain ravines where patches of Afromontane forest persist.

The arid interior is dominated by Karoo drought-resistant shrubbery. The West Coast and Little Karoo are semi-arid regions and are typified by many species of succulents and drought-resistant shrubs and acacia trees. The Garden Route on the south coast (between the Outeniqua Mountains and the Southern Indian Ocean) is extremely lush, with temperate rainforest (or Afromontane Forest) covering many areas adjacent to the coast, in the deep river valleys and along the southern slopes of the Outeniqua mountain range. Typical species are hardwoods of exceptional height, such as Yellowwood, Stinkwood and Ironwood trees.

Climate

The Western Cape is climatologically diverse, with many distinct micro- and macroclimates created by the varied topography and the influence of the surrounding ocean currents. These are the warm Agulhas Current which flows southwards along South Africa's east coast, and the cold Benguela Current which is an upwelling current from the depths of the South Atlantic Ocean along South Africa's west coast. Thus climatic statistics can vary greatly over short distances. Most of the province is considered to have a Mediterranean climate with cool, wet winters and warm, dry summers. Both the Great Karoo and Little Karoo, in the interior, have an arid to semi-arid climate with cold, frosty winters and hot summers with occasional thunderstorms. The Garden Route and the Overberg on the south coast have a maritime climate with cool, moist winters and mild, moist summers. Mossel Bay in the Garden Route is considered to have the second mildest climate worldwide after Hawaii. The La Niña phase of the El Niño-Southern Oscillation cycle tends to increase rainfall in this region in the dry season (November to April).

Thunderstorms are generally rare in the province (except in the Karoo) with most precipitation being of a frontal or orographic nature. Extremes of heat and cold are common inland, but rare near the coast. Snow is a common winter occurrence on the Western Cape Mountains occasionally reaching down into the more inland valleys. Otherwise, frost is relatively rare in coastal areas and many of the heavily cultivated valleys.

Political history

Cape Liberal Tradition 
The Cape has had a long tradition of holding liberal values. For example, the Cape Qualified Franchise before the Union of South Africa.

Cape Qualified Franchise 

The Cape Qualified Franchise was the system of non-racial franchise that was adhered to in the Cape Colony, and in the Cape Province in the early years of the Union of South Africa. Qualifications for the right to vote at parliamentary elections were applied equally to all men, regardless of race.

This local system of multi-racial suffrage was later gradually restricted, and eventually abolished, under various National Party and United Party governments. In 1930 white women were enfranchised, and in 1931 property qualifications for white voters were removed. In 1936 black voters were then removed from the common voters' rolls and allowed only to elect separate members in 1936, and subsequently denied all representation in the House of Assembly in 1960. Coloured voters similarly followed in 1958 and 1970, respectively.

Contribution of the Western Cape in the National Youth Uprisings 
The Black Consciousness Movement (BCM) was a grassroots anti-Apartheid activist movement that emerged in South Africa in the mid-1960s out of the political vacuum created by the jailing and banning of the African National Congress and Pan Africanist Congress leadership after the Sharpeville Massacre in 1960. The BCM represented a social movement for political consciousness.

In December 1968, the South African Student Organization (SASO) was formed at a conference held in Marianhill, Natal. The conference was exclusively attended by Black students. After its launch, SASO became the medium through which black consciousness ideology spread to schools and other university campuses across the country.

In 1974, South African Minister of Bantu Education and Development MC Botha, constituted the imposition of using Afrikaans as a medium of instruction in black schools, effective with students in Grade 7 (Standard 5) upwards. As early as March 1976, students began passive resistance against Afrikaans, fueling the outbreak of the Soweto Uprising on 16 June 1976. Consequently, the student protests spread to other parts of the country, and Cape Town became a pivotal site for Western Cape student revolt.

Student leaders at the University of the Western Cape (UWC) and the University of Cape Town (UCT) organised marches. Poster parades by UWC and Black Power Salute marches by UCT was broken by the police, resulting in 73 students getting arrested and detained at Victor Verster Prison, near Paarl.

On 1 September 1976, the unrest spread to the city of Cape Town itself. Approximately 2000 black students from Western Cape townships, namely Langa, Nyanga and Gugulethu, matched the Cape Town central business district (CBD). Coloured students also contributed to the protests by peacefully marching to the city, but were blockaded by the police in the CBD. The protests turned violent when coloured students started burning schools, libraries and a magistrate's court in support of the student revolt. Thereafter, 200,000 coloured workers partook in a two-day strike staying away from work in the Cape Town area.

According to a report by the Truth and Reconciliation Commission (TRC), the Western Cape experienced the second highest number of deaths and casualties associated with the 1976 uprising protests.

1994 and the Western Cape post-apartheid 
In 1994, at the introduction of the Interim Constitution and the first non-racial election, South Africa's original provinces and bantustans were abolished and nine new provinces were established. The former Cape Province was divided into the Western Cape, Northern Cape, Eastern Cape and part of North West.

In the 1994 election, the Western Cape was one of two provinces that did not elect an African National Congress (ANC) provincial government (the other being KwaZulu-Natal). The National Party (NP) won 53% of the votes and 23 seats in the 42-seat provincial legislature, and Hernus Kriel, a former Minister of Law and Order, was elected Premier. He resigned in 1998 and was replaced by Gerald Morkel.

The 1999 election marked the beginning of a period of great turbulence in Western Cape politics. No party achieved an absolute majority in the provincial parliament, as the ANC won 18 seats while the New National Party (NNP), successor to the NP, won 17. The NNP went into coalition with the Democratic Party (DP), which won 5 seats, to form a government, and Morkel remained Premier. In 2000 the DP and the NNP formalised their coalition by forming the Democratic Alliance (DA).

In 2001, however, the NNP broke with the DA over the removal of Peter Marais from office as Mayor of Cape Town by DA leader Tony Leon. The NNP instead went into coalition with the ANC; Gerald Morkel, who was opposed to the split, resigned as Premier and was replaced by Peter Marais. In 2002 Marais resigned as Premier due to a sexual harassment scandal, and was replaced by NNP leader Marthinus van Schalkwyk. During the 2003 floor-crossing period four members of the provincial parliament crossed to the ANC, giving it an absolute majority of 22 seats in the 42-seat house. However, the ANC remained in coalition with the NNP and van Schalkwyk remained as Premier.

In the 2004 election, there was again no absolute winner in the provincial parliament; this time the ANC won 19 seats, the DA won 12, and the NNP won 5. The ANC-NNP coalition continued in power, but van Schalkwyk took up a ministerial post in the national cabinet and was replaced as Premier by the ANC's Ebrahim Rasool. The NNP was finally dissolved after the 2005 floor-crossing period and its members joined the ANC, again giving that party an absolute majority of 24 seats. In the 2007 floor-crossing period the ANC gained a further three members of the provincial parliament. In 2008 Rasool resigned as Premier due to internal party politics, and was replaced by Lynne Brown.

The 2009 election marked a significant change in Western Cape politics, as the Democratic Alliance won 51% of the votes and an absolute majority of 22 seats in the provincial parliament, while the ANC won 14 seats with 31% of the vote. The DA leader Helen Zille was elected Premier. In 2010 the Independent Democrats, which had won 3 seats with 5% of the vote, merged with the DA. In the 2014 election the DA won 59% of the votes and an absolute majority of 26 seats in the provincial parliament, while the ANC won 14 seats with 32% of the vote. In 2018 King Khoebaha Cornelius III Declared the independence of the "Sovereign State of Good Hope".

In the 2019 election, the DA retained their majority in the province, but with a reduction in support. It had won 24 seats with 55%. Helen Zille was term-limited and the DA premier candidate Alan Winde succeeded her. The ANC also lost support. It had received 12 seats with 28% support, its lowest showing since 1994. Veteran politician Peter Marais returned to the provincial parliament as the sole representative of the Freedom Front Plus. Patricia de Lille formed another party, Good, and it achieved a seat.

Cape Independence Movement 

Since the late 2000s there has been growing support for Western Cape, or Greater Cape, independence from South Africa. Political parties such as the Cape Independence Party and organisations such as the Cape Independence Advocacy Group and CapeXit, wish to bring forth the constitutional and peaceful secession of the Cape. The Freedom Front Plus and Cape Coloured Congress have also stated that they support Cape independence.

There is substantial support for the idea with CapeXit garnering over 800,000 signed mandates in May 2021. A poll conducted in 2020 indicated that 36% of the Western Cape's population would support independence, while 47% would support a referendum on the issue. In 2021, a new poll indicated that 58% of the population would now support a referendum on independence, and 46% would support outright independence.

Law and government

The provincial government is established under the Constitution of the Western Cape, which was adopted in 1998. The people of the province elect the 42-member Western Cape Provincial Parliament every five years by a system of party-list proportional representation. The fifth provincial parliament was elected in the election of 8 May 2019; 24 seats are held by the Democratic Alliance, 12 by the African National Congress, 2 by the Economic Freedom Fighters, and 1 each by Good, the African Christian Democratic Party, Al Jama-ah, and the Freedom Front Plus. The provincial parliament is responsible for legislating within its responsibilities as set out by the national constitution; these responsibilities include agriculture, education, environment, health services, housing, language policies, tourism, trade, and welfare.

The provincial parliament also elects the Premier of the Western Cape to lead the provincial executive. Since 2019 the Premiership has been held by Alan Winde, former Provincial Minister of Community Safety. The Premier appoints ten members of the provincial legislature to serve as a cabinet of ministers, overseeing the departments of the provincial government. These departments are Agriculture, Community Safety, Cultural Affairs and Sport, Economic Development and Tourism, Education, Environmental Affairs and Development Planning, Health, Human Settlements, Local Government, Social Development, Transport and Public Works, and the Provincial Treasury.

Municipalities

The Western Cape Province is divided into one metropolitan municipality and five district municipalities. The district municipalities are in turn divided into 24 local municipalities.

In the following interactive map, the district and metropolitan municipalities are labelled in capital letters and shaded in various different colours. 
Clicking on the district on the map loads the appropriate article:

District and metropolitan municipalities

Local and metropolitan municipalities

Economy

The Western Cape's total GDP for 2008 was R268bn, 14% of the country's total GDP, and R97,664 per capita. Provincially, it is the third highest contributor to the country's GDP behind Gauteng and KwaZulu-Natal. It also has one of the fastest growing economies in the country, growing at 4% in 2008. At 19.3% the province has a lower unemployment rate than the national average standing at 20% in 2018. The Western Cape's Human Development Index is the highest in South Africa at 0.741 compared to the South African average of 0.705 in 2018.

The biggest sector in the Western Cape's economy is the financial, business services and real estate sectors contributing approximately R77 billion in 2008. Manufacturing was the second largest contributor valued at R43.7 billion in 2008 with the agricultural sector being the fastest growing at 10.6% in the same year. High-tech industries, international call centres, fashion design, advertising and TV production are niche industries rapidly gaining in importance.

The city of Cape Town accounts for roughly 80% of the Western Cape's GDP.

95% of wine produced in South Africa is produced in the Western Cape. South Africa is the 7th largest wine producing region in the world.

Transport

The Western Cape has an excellent network of highways comparable with any first-world country. The primary highways are the N1 (from Cape Town to Three Sisters, continuing outside the province towards Bloemfontein and Johannesburg), N2 (from Cape Town to Bloukrans River, towards Port Elizabeth), N7 (from Cape Town to Bitterfontein, continuing towards Springbok and Namibia) and N12 (from George to Three Sisters, continuing towards Kimberley and Johannesburg). Other routes are the "R" roads which connect the smaller towns. All major roads are tarred with major rural gravel roads well maintained. Limited access motorways are limited to the Cape Metropolitan Area, Winelands and Garden Route, however due to the low population density of the remainder of the province, the highways remain efficient and high-speed, except during peak holiday travel seasons, when travel can be slow-going in places due to heavy traffic.

Demographics 

The 2011 Census recorded the population of the Western Cape as 5,822,734 people living in 1,634,000 households.

The age distribution of the province was as follows: 25.1% were under the age of 15, 18.3% from 15 to 24, 32.7% from 25 to 44, 18.0% from 45 to 64, and 5.9% who are 65 years of age or older. The median age is 28 years. For every 100 women there are 96 men.

49% of the people of the Western Cape described themselves as "Coloured", while 33% described themselves as "Black African", 17% as "White", and 1% as "Indian or Asian". Afrikaans is the plurality language, spoken as the first language of 50% of the province's population. IsiXhosa is the first language of 25% of the population, while English is the first language of 20%.

Roughly 16% (894,289 people) of the Western Cape's population in 2011 were born in the Eastern Cape, 3% (167,524) in Gauteng and 1% (61,945) in KwaZulu-Natal. People born outside of South Africa amounted to 4% of the province's population or 260,952 people.  Between 2001 and 2007 the Western Cape received 41% of all internal migrants within South Africa with a large majority of these new Western Cape residents coming from the former Transkei region of the Eastern Cape; who were drawn by better economic prospects and higher standards of living.

Economic status 
90% of households in the province have a flush toilet and 90% have refuse removed by the local council at least once a week. 75% of households have piped tap water inside the dwelling, while a further 13% have piped water on their property; 11% receive piped water at a community tap, while 1% have no access to piped water. One in seven people live in an informal dwelling. 86.9% of households use electricity for cooking, and 93% use it for lighting. 89% of households have a cellphone and 31% have a landline telephone, while 86% own a television, 81% own a refrigerator, and 34% own a computer. 44% of households have access to the Internet.

The average annual household income was R143,460, the second-highest in the country after Gauteng. , 69% of the population aged 15–64 are economically active, and of these 25% are unemployed. Overall, 52% of the working-age population are employed. Around 2 million people in the Western Cape labour market (those aged 16 to 64) are employed, 1.3 million are not economically active, 552,733 are unemployed with an additional 122,753 who are discouraged work seekers who want to work but have given up looking for it.

Education 
2.7% of residents aged 20 and over have received no schooling, 10.7% have had only some primary, 5.6% have completed primary school but gone no further, 38% have had some secondary education without finishing Grade 12, 28% have finished Grade 12 but gone no further, and 14% have higher education beyond the secondary level. Overall, 43% of residents have completed high school.

Cities and towns

Education

The Western Cape province has the most highly educated residents with a very skilled workforce in comparison to any other African region. The high school graduation rate is consistently around 80%, higher than any other province. The proportion of adults with a degree or higher was 4.8% (2005), the highest in the country.

The province also boasts four universities:
Cape Peninsula University of Technology
Stellenbosch University
University of Cape Town
University of the Western Cape

The province is also home to the South African Military Academy.

Culture

Cuisine

Types of cuisine originating from the Western Cape include Dutch and Malay cuisines. Other types of South African cuisine are also found and commonly enjoyed in the province. Over 50% of all cheese in South Africa is produced in the Western Cape. Four of the top ten entries in Trip Advisor's Best Fine Dining Restaurants – Africa list for 2021 are in the Western Cape.

Winelands

The Western Cape is known for its wine production and vineyards. The winelands are divided into six main regions: Boberg, Breede River Valley, Cape South Coast, Coastal Region, Klein Karoo and Olifants River. Each has unique climate, topography and fertile soil. Distilled wine or brandy is produced in the Cape Winelands, Overberg, and Garden Route districts of the province. Brandy from these regions is regarded as amongst the best in the world due to the high, legally-enforced distilling standards in the region, technically making it equivalent to Cognac.

See also 
 Cape Colony
 Cape Independence
 Cape Qualified Franchise

References

External links

Provincial Government of the Western Cape
Western Cape Tourism
Western Cape Investment and Trade Promotion Agency
Municipal Demarcation Board
Western Cape on Wazimap.co.za

 
Provinces of South Africa
States and territories established in 1994
1994 establishments in South Africa